Bishop Vasyl Ivasyuk (born 21 January 1960 in Dora, Stanislav Oblast, Ukrainian SSR /present day Yaremche, Ivano-Frankivsk Oblast, Ukraine/) is a Ukrainian Greek Catholic hierarch as an Eparchial Bishop of Ukrainian Catholic Eparchy of Kolomyia since 13 February 2014 (until 12 September 2017 with title of Kolomyia – Chernivtsi). Previously he served as an Archiepiscopal Exarch of Odessa-Krym from 28 July 2003 until 13 February 2014 and as an Archiepiscopal Administrator of the Kolomyia – Chernivtsi from 25 May 2013 until 13 February 2014 as a Titular Bishop of Benda.

Life
Ivasyuk was born in a family of clandestine Greek-Catholics in the Western Ukraine. He joined a clandestine theological seminary, while studying in the Melioration Institute in Rivne.

He was ordained a priest on August 16, 1989, and worked as pastor among the faithful of the "Catacomb Church". Then Ivasyuk continued his theological studies in the Theological Seminary in Ternopil and in the Pontifical Gregorian University in Rome, obtaining a licentiate degree in dogmatic theology. At the same time, from 1989 until 1990 he served as parish priest in Stare Misto and Pidhaitsi and from 1990 until 1993 as a parish priest and Dean of Berezhany Deanery. Later he served a Protosynkellos of the Ukrainian Catholic Eparchy of Zboriv and after returning from his studies in Rome, as a Protosynkellos of the Ukrainian Catholic Eparchy of Sokal.

On July 28, 2003, Ivasyuk was appointed and on September 28, 2003, was consecrated to the episcopate as the first Archiepiscopal Exarch of Odessa-Krym. The principal consecrator was Cardinal Lubomyr Husar, the head of the Ukrainian Greek Catholic Church.

References

 

1960 births
Living people
People from Yaremche
Pontifical Gregorian University alumni
Ukrainian Eastern Catholics
21st-century Eastern Catholic bishops
Bishops of the Ukrainian Greek Catholic Church